Hyphodontia aspera is a species of fungus in the family Schizoporaceae.

References 

Fungi described in 1874
Hymenochaetales
Fungal plant pathogens and diseases
Taxa named by Elias Magnus Fries